This is a list of prefects of Varaždin County.

Prefects of Varaždin County (1993–present)

See also
Varaždin County

Notes

External links
World Statesmen - Varaždin County

Varaždin County